The County of Boondooma is a county (a cadastral division) in the Wide Bay–Burnett region of Queensland, Australia. It was named and bounded by the Governor in Council on 7 March 1901 under the Land Act 1897.

Parishes
Boondooma is divided into parishes, as listed below:

References

External links 

 

Boondooma